Nupserha ugandensis is a species of beetle in the family Cerambycidae. It was described by Stephan von Breuning in 1978. It is known from Uganda.

References

Endemic fauna of Uganda
ugandensis
Beetles described in 1978